La poliziotta della squadra del buon costume (internationally released as A Policewoman on the Porno Squad) is a 1979 commedia sexy all'italiana directed by Michele Massimo Tarantini. It is the sequel of Tarantini's La poliziotta fa carriera and it is followed by La poliziotta a New York.

Cast 
 Edwige Fenech: Gianna D'Amico
 Lino Banfi: Commissioner Scappavia
 Alvaro Vitali: Agent Tarallo
 Gianfranco Barra: Commissioner Nardecchia 
 Marzio Honorato: Agent Arturo 
 Franco Diogene: Joe Maccarone 
 Giacomo Rizzo: Cocozza 
 Sal Borgese: Pierre La Turraine

References

External links

1979 films
Commedia sexy all'italiana
Poliziotta films
1970s police comedy films
1970s sex comedy films
Films directed by Michele Massimo Tarantini
1979 comedy films
1970s Italian films